This is a list of books that were published by the Kelmscott Press. They are taken from the Chronological List of the Books Printed at the Kelmscott Press and A Note by William Morris on His Aims in Founding the Kelmscott Press. Titles with no listed author are by William Morris.

1891
The Story of the Glittering Plain.
Poems By the Way.

1892
The Love-Lyrics and Songs of Proteus,  Wilfrid Scawen Blunt.
The Nature of Gothic, John Ruskin.
The Defence of Guenevere.
A Dream of John Ball.
The Golden Legend, Jacobus de Voragine.
The Recuyell of the Historyes of Troye, Raoul Lefèvre; trans. William Caxton; ed. H. Halliday Sparling.
Biblia Innocentium, J. W. Mackail.

1893
The History of Reynard the Foxe, William Caxton; ed. H. Halliday Sparling.
The Poems of William Shakespeare ed. F.S. Ellis.
News from Nowhere.
The Order of Chivalry, trans. Caxton; ed. F. S. Ellis.
The Life of Thomas Wolsey, Cardinal Archbishop of York, George Cavendish; ed. F. S. Ellis.
The History of Godefrey of Boloyne and of the Conquest of Iherusalem, William of Tyre; ed. H. Halliday Sparling. 
Utopia, Thomas More; ed. F. S. Ellis.
Maud: A Monodrama, Alfred Tennyson.
Gothic Architecture: A Lecture for the Arts and Crafts Exhibition Society.
Sidonia the Sorceress, William Meinhold; trans. Jane Wilde.
Ballads and Narrative Poems, D. G. Rossetti.
The Tale of King Florus and the Fair Jehane; trans. Morris.

1894
The Story of the Glittering Plain.
Of the Friendship of Amis and Amile, trans. ris.
Sonnets and Lyrical Poems, D. G. Rossetti.
The Poems of John Keats, ed. F. S. Ellis.
Atlanta in Calydon: A Tragedy, A. C. Swinburne.
The Tale of the Emperor of Coustans and of Over the Sea, trans. Morris.
The Wood Beyond the World.
The Book of Wisdom and Lies, Sulkhan-Saba Orbeliani, trans. Oliver Wardrop
The Poetical Works of Percy Bysshe Shelley, ed. F. S. Ellis.
Psalmi Penitentiales, ed. F. S. Ellis.
Epistola de Contemptu Mundi Di Frate Hieronymo [Salvonarola] da Ferrara, ed. C. F. Murray.

1895
The Tale of Beowulf, trans. A. J. Wyatt and Morris.
The Poetical Works of Percy Bysshe Shelley, Volume II.
Syr Perecyvelle of Gales, ed. F. S. Ellis.
The Life and Death of Jason: A Poem.
The Story of the Child Christopher and Goldilind the Fair.
The Poetical Works of Percy Bysshe Shelley, Volume III.
Hand and Soul, D. G. Rossetti.

1896
Poems Chosen out of the Works of Robert Herrick ed. F. S. Ellis.
Poems Chosen Out of the Works of Samuel Taylor Coleridge ed. F. S. Ellis.
The Well At the World's End.
The Works of Geoffrey Chaucer.
The Earthly Paradise. Volume I.
Laudes Beatae Mariae Virginis ed. S. C. Cockerell.
The Earthly Paradise. Volume II.
The Floure and the Leafe, ed. F. S. Ellis.
The Shepheardes Calendar, Edmund Spenser; ed. F. S. Ellis.
The Earthly Paradise. Volume III.

1897
The Story of Sigurd.
The Earthly Paradise. Volume IV.
The Earthly Paradise. Volume V.
The Earthly Paradise. Volume VI.
The Earthly Paradise. Volume VII.
The Water of the Wondrous Isles.
The Earthly Paradise. Volume VIII.
Syr Ysambrace, ed. F. S. Ellis.
Sire Degrevaunt, ed. F. S. Ellis.

1898
Some German Woodcuts of the Fifteenth Century, ed. S. C. Cockerell.
The Story of Sigurd the Volsung and the Fall of the Niblungs.
The Sundering Flood.
Love is Enough, or the of Freeing Pharamond: A Morality.
A Note by William Morris on His Aims in Founding the Kelmscott Press.

References

Further reading 
 

Private press movement
Kelmscott Press
Harold B. Lee Library-related rare books articles